Les Ailes was a French aviation magazine published weekly from 1921 to 1963. It was founded by Georges Houard in Paris, who served as editor in chief. Publication was suspended from 6 June 1940 to 2 December 1944 on account of World War II. The magazine was published in black and white on blue paper, until ceasing publication for good on 8 March 1963, with issue number 1916.

References

1921 establishments in France
1963 disestablishments in France
Aviation magazines
Defunct magazines published in France
French-language magazines
Magazines established in 1921
Magazines disestablished in 1963
Magazines published in Paris